Amara quenseli is a species of seed-eating ground beetle in the family Carabidae. It is found in Europe and Northern Asia (excluding China) and North America.

Subspecies
These two subspecies belong to the species Amara quenseli:
 Amara quenseli quenseli (Schönherr, 1806) i c g
 Amara quenseli silvicola Zimmermann, 1832 c g
Data sources: i = ITIS, c = Catalogue of Life, g = GBIF, b = Bugguide.net

References

Further reading

 

quenseli
Articles created by Qbugbot
Beetles described in 1806